Naturally occurring nickel (28Ni) is composed of five stable isotopes; , , ,  and , with  being the most abundant (68.077% natural abundance). 26 radioisotopes have been characterised with the most stable being  with a half-life of 76,000 years,  with a half-life of 100.1 years, and  with a half-life of 6.077 days. All of the remaining radioactive isotopes have half-lives that are less than 60 hours and the majority of these have half-lives that are less than 30 seconds. This element also has 8 meta states.

List of isotopes

|-
| 
| style="text-align:right" | 28
| style="text-align:right" | 20
| 48.01975(54)#
| 10# ms[>500 ns]
|
|
| 0+
|
|
|-
| 
| style="text-align:right" | 28
| style="text-align:right" | 21
| 49.00966(43)#
| 13(4) ms[12(+5−3) ms]
|
|
| 7/2−#
|
|
|-
| 
| style="text-align:right" | 28
| style="text-align:right" | 22
| 49.99593(28)#
| 9.1(18) ms
| β+
| 50Co
| 0+
|
|
|-
| 
| style="text-align:right" | 28
| style="text-align:right" | 23
| 50.98772(28)#
| 30# ms[>200 ns]
| β+
| 51Co
| 7/2−#
|
|
|-
| rowspan=2|
| rowspan=2 style="text-align:right" | 28
| rowspan=2 style="text-align:right" | 24
| rowspan=2|51.97568(9)#
| rowspan=2|38(5) ms
| β+ (83%)
| 52Co
| rowspan=2|0+
| rowspan=2|
| rowspan=2|
|- 
| β+, p (17%)
| 51Fe
|-
| rowspan=2|
| rowspan=2 style="text-align:right" | 28
| rowspan=2 style="text-align:right" | 25
| rowspan=2|52.96847(17)#
| rowspan=2|45(15) ms
| β+ (55%)
| 53Co
| rowspan=2|(7/2−)#
| rowspan=2|
| rowspan=2|
|-
| β+, p (45%)
| 52Fe
|-
| 
| style="text-align:right" | 28
| style="text-align:right" | 26
| 53.95791(5)
| 104(7) ms
| β+
| 54Co
| 0+
|
|
|-
| 
| style="text-align:right" | 28
| style="text-align:right" | 27
| 54.951330(12)
| 204.7(17) ms
| β+
| 55Co
| 7/2−
|
|
|-
| 
| style="text-align:right" | 28
| style="text-align:right" | 28
| 55.942132(12)
| 6.075(10) d
| β+
| 
| 0+
|
|
|-
| 
| style="text-align:right" | 28
| style="text-align:right" | 29
| 56.9397935(19)
| 35.60(6) h
| β+
| 
| 3/2−
|
|
|-
| 
| style="text-align:right" | 28
| style="text-align:right" | 30
| 57.9353429(7)
| colspan=3 align=center|Observationally stable
| 0+
| 0.680769(89)
|
|-
| rowspan=2 | 
| rowspan=2 style="text-align:right" | 28
| rowspan=2 style="text-align:right" | 31
| rowspan=2 | 58.9343467(7)
| rowspan=2 | 7.6(5)×104 y
| EC (99%)
| rowspan=2 | 
| rowspan=2 | 3/2−
| rowspan=2 | 
| rowspan=2 | 
|-
| β+ (1.5%)
|-
| 
| style="text-align:right" | 28
| style="text-align:right" | 32
| 59.9307864(7)
| colspan=3 align=center|Stable
| 0+
| 0.262231(77)
|
|-
| 
| style="text-align:right" | 28
| style="text-align:right" | 33
| 60.9310560(7)
| colspan=3 align=center|Stable
| 3/2−
| 0.011399(6)
|
|-
| 
| style="text-align:right" | 28
| style="text-align:right" | 34
| 61.9283451(6)
| colspan=3 align=center|Stable
| 0+
| 0.036345(17)
|
|-
| 
| style="text-align:right" | 28
| style="text-align:right" | 35
| 62.9296694(6)
| 100.1(20) y
| β−
| 
| 1/2−
|
|
|-
| style="text-indent:1em" | 
| colspan="3" style="text-indent:2em" | 87.15(11) keV
| 1.67(3) μs
|
|
| 5/2−
|
|
|-
| 
| style="text-align:right" | 28
| style="text-align:right" | 36
| 63.9279660(7)
| colspan=3 align=center|Stable
| 0+
| 0.009256(9)
|
|-
| 
| style="text-align:right" | 28
| style="text-align:right" | 37
| 64.9300843(7)
| 2.5172(3) h
| β−
| 
| 5/2−
|
|
|-
| style="text-indent:1em" | 
| colspan="3" style="text-indent:2em" | 63.37(5) keV
| 69(3) μs
|
|
| 1/2−
|
|
|-
| 
| style="text-align:right" | 28
| style="text-align:right" | 38
| 65.9291393(15)
| 54.6(3) h
| β−
| 
| 0+
|
|
|-
| 
| style="text-align:right" | 28
| style="text-align:right" | 39
| 66.931569(3)
| 21(1) s
| β−
| 
| 1/2−
|
|
|-
| rowspan=2 style="text-indent:1em" | 
| rowspan=2 colspan="3" style="text-indent:2em" | 1007(3) keV
| rowspan=2|13.3(2) μs
| β−
| 
| rowspan=2|9/2+
| rowspan=2|
| rowspan=2|
|-
| IT
| 67Ni
|-
| 
| style="text-align:right" | 28
| style="text-align:right" | 40
| 67.931869(3)
| 29(2) s
| β−
| 
| 0+
|
|
|-
| style="text-indent:1em" | 
| colspan="3" style="text-indent:2em" | 1770.0(10) keV
| 276(65) ns
|
|
| 0+
|
|
|-
| style="text-indent:1em" | 
| colspan="3" style="text-indent:2em" | 2849.1(3) keV
| 860(50) μs
|
|
| 5−
|
|
|-
| 
| style="text-align:right" | 28
| style="text-align:right" | 41
| 68.935610(4)
| 11.5(3) s
| β−
| 
| 9/2+
|
|
|-
| rowspan=2 style="text-indent:1em" | 
| rowspan=2 colspan="3" style="text-indent:2em" | 321(2) keV
| rowspan=2|3.5(4) s
| β−
| 
| rowspan=2|(1/2−)
| rowspan=2|
| rowspan=2|
|-
| IT
| 69Ni
|-
| style="text-indent:1em" | 
| colspan="3" style="text-indent:2em" | 2701(10) keV
| 439(3) ns
|
|
| (17/2−)
|
|
|-
| 
| style="text-align:right" | 28
| style="text-align:right" | 42
| 69.93650(37)
| 6.0(3) s
| β−
| 
| 0+
|
|
|-
| style="text-indent:1em" | 
| colspan="3" style="text-indent:2em" | 2860(2) keV
| 232(1) ns
|
|
| 8+
|
|
|-
| 
| style="text-align:right" | 28
| style="text-align:right" | 43
| 70.94074(40)
| 2.56(3) s
| β−
| 
| 1/2−#
|
|
|-
| rowspan=2|
| rowspan=2 style="text-align:right" | 28
| rowspan=2 style="text-align:right" | 44
| rowspan=2|71.94209(47)
| rowspan=2|1.57(5) s
| β− (>99.9%)
| 
| rowspan=2|0+
| rowspan=2|
| rowspan=2|
|-
| β−, n (<.1%)
| 
|-
| rowspan=2|
| rowspan=2 style="text-align:right" | 28
| rowspan=2 style="text-align:right" | 45
| rowspan=2|72.94647(32)#
| rowspan=2|0.84(3) s
| β− (>99.9%)
| 
| rowspan=2|(9/2+)
| rowspan=2|
| rowspan=2|
|-
| β−, n (<.1%)
| 
|-
| rowspan=2|
| rowspan=2 style="text-align:right" | 28
| rowspan=2 style="text-align:right" | 46
| rowspan=2|73.94807(43)#
| rowspan=2|0.68(18) s
| β− (>99.9%)
| 
| rowspan=2|0+
| rowspan=2|
| rowspan=2|
|-
| β−, n (<.1%)
| 
|-
| rowspan=2|
| rowspan=2 style="text-align:right" | 28
| rowspan=2 style="text-align:right" | 47
| rowspan=2|74.95287(43)#
| rowspan=2|0.6(2) s
| β− (98.4%)
| 
| rowspan=2|(7/2+)#
| rowspan=2|
| rowspan=2|
|-
| β−, n (1.6%)
| 
|-
| rowspan=2|
| rowspan=2 style="text-align:right" | 28
| rowspan=2 style="text-align:right" | 48
| rowspan=2|75.95533(97)#
| rowspan=2|470(390) ms[0.24(+55−24) s]
| β− (>99.9%)
| 
| rowspan=2|0+
| rowspan=2|
| rowspan=2|
|-
| β−, n (<.1%)
| 
|-
| 
| style="text-align:right" | 28
| style="text-align:right" | 49
| 76.96055(54)#
| 300# ms[>300 ns]
| β−
| 
| 9/2+#
|
|
|-
| 
| style="text-align:right" | 28
| style="text-align:right" | 50
| 77.96318(118)#
| 120# ms[>300 ns]
| β−
| 
| 0+
|
|
|-
|
| style="text-align:right" | 28
| style="text-align:right" | 51
| 78.970400(640)#
| 43.0 ms +86−75
| β−
|
|
|
|
|-
|
| style="text-align:right" | 28
| style="text-align:right" | 52
| 78.970400(640)#
| 24 ms +26−17
| β−
|
|
|
|

Notable isotopes 

Nickel-48, discovered in 1999, is the most neutron-poor nickel isotope known. With 28 protons and 20 neutrons  is "doubly magic" (like ) and therefore much more stable (with a lower limit of its half-life-time of .5 μs) than would be expected from its position in the chart of nuclides. It has the highest ratio of protons to neutrons (proton excess) of any known doubly magic nuclide.

Nickel-56 is produced in large quantities in supernovas and the shape of the light curve of these supernovas display characteristic timescales corresponding to the decay of nickel-56 to cobalt-56 and then to iron-56.

Nickel-58 is the most abundant isotope of nickel, making up 68.077% of the natural abundance. Possible sources include electron capture from copper-58 and EC + p from zinc-59.
 
Nickel-59 is a long-lived cosmogenic radionuclide with a half-life of 76,000 years.  has found many applications in isotope geology.  has been used to date the terrestrial age of meteorites and to determine abundances of extraterrestrial dust in ice and sediment.

Nickel-60 is the daughter product of the extinct radionuclide  (half-life = 2.6 My). Therefore, the abundance of  present in extraterrestrial material may provide insight into the origin of the Solar System and its early history/very early history. Unfortunately, nickel isotopes appear to have been heterogeneously distributed in the early Solar System. Other sources may also include beta decay from cobalt-60 and electron capture from copper-60.

Nickel-61 is the only stable isotope of nickel with a nuclear spin (I = 3/2), which makes it useful for studies by EPR spectroscopy.

Nickel-62 has the highest binding energy per nucleon of any isotope for any element, when including the electron shell in the calculation. More energy is released forming this isotope than any other, although fusion can form heavier isotopes. For instance, two  atoms can fuse to form  plus 4 positrons (plus 4 neutrinos), liberating 77 keV per nucleon, but reactions leading to the iron/nickel region are more probable as they release more energy per baryon.

Nickel-63 has two main uses: Detection of explosives traces, and in certain kinds of electronic devices, such as gas discharge tubes used as surge protectors. A surge protector is a device that protects sensitive electronic equipment like computers from sudden changes in the electric current flowing into them. It is also used in Electron capture detector in gas chromatography for the detection mainly of halogens. It is proposed to be used for miniature betavoltaic generators for pacemakers.

Nickel-64 is another stable isotope of nickel. Possible sources include beta decay from cobalt-64, and electron capture from copper-64.

Nickel-78 is one of the element's heaviest known isotopes. With 28 protons and 50 neutrons, nickel-78 is doubly magic, resulting in much greater nuclear binding energy and stability despite having a lopsided neutron-proton ratio. It has a half-life of 122 ± 5.1 milliseconds. As a consequence of its magic neutron number, nickel-78 is believed to have an important involvement in supernova nucleosynthesis of elements heavier than iron. 78Ni, along with N = 50 isotones 79Cu and 80Zn, are thought to constitute a waiting point in the r-process, where further neutron capture is delayed by the shell gap and a buildup of isotopes around A = 80 results.

References

 Isotope masses from:

 Isotopic compositions and standard atomic masses from:

 Half-life, spin, and isomer data selected from the following sources.

 
Nickel
Nickel